Hexi (河西) may refer to:

Historical entities of China
 Guiyi Circuit, a regime during the Five Dynasties and Ten Kingdoms period that controlled the Hexi Corridor
 Hexi Province (河西省), a province, now defunct, of the Republic of China
 A name for the Western Xia, a Tangut-led Chinese dynasty

Locations in the People's Republic of China
Geographic region
 Hexi Corridor, corridor in Gansu

Districts
 Hexi District, Tianjin
 Hexi District, Sanya, township-level district of Sanya, Hainan

Subdistricts
Hexi Subdistrict, Huazhou, Guangdong, in Huazhou City, Guangdong
Hexi Subdistrict, Lufeng, Guangdong, in Lufeng City, Guangdong
Hexi Subdistrict, Maoming, in Maonan District, Maoming, Guangdong
Hexi Subdistrict, Laibin, in Xingbin District, Laibin, Guangxi
Hexi Subdistrict, Liuzhou, in Liunan District, Liuzhou, Guangxi
Hexi Subdistrict, Tongren, in Bijiang District, Tongren, Guizhou
Hexi Subdistrict, Hengshui, in Taocheng District, Hengshui, Hebei
Hexi Subdistrict, Genhe, in Genhe City, Inner Mongolia
Hexi Subdistrict, Zhalantun, in Zhalantun City, Inner Mongolia
Hexi Subdistrict, Tongliao, in Horqin District, Tongliao, Inner Mongolia
Hexi Subdistrict, Delingha, in Delingha, Qinghai
Hexi Subdistrict, Golmud, in Golmud City, Qinghai
Hexi Subdistrict, Qingdao, in Sifang District, Qingdao, Shandong
Hexi Subdistrict, Guangyuan, in Lizhou District, Guangyuan, Sichuan
Hexi Subdistrict, Tianjin, in Binhai New Area, Tianjin
Hexi New Town, in Nanjing, Jiangsu

Towns
 Hexi, Jingning She Autonomous County (鹤溪镇), in Jingning She Autonomous County, Zhejiang

Written as "河西镇":
 Hexi, Linxi County, Hebei
 Hexi, Fuxin, in Qinghemen District, Fuxin, Liaoning
 Hexi, Ankang, in Hanbin District, Ankang, Shaanxi
 Hexi, Gaoping, in Gaoping City, Shanxi
 Hexi, Tonghai County, in Tonghai County, Yunnan
Hexi, Guide County, in Guide County, Qinghai